The Alabama High School Graduation Exam (AHSGE) was a test to assess mastery of content standards, introduced during the No Child Left Behind education reform effort and discontinued in 2013. It was administered in grades 10-12.  Students were not allowed to receive a diploma until they had passed all sections of the exam.

References

Education in Alabama
Standardized tests in the United States
2013 disestablishments in Alabama